Nigel Eaton is a British multi-instrumentalist and composer best known for playing the hurdy-gurdy. Born in Lyndhurst, Eaton played the piano and cello before switching to the hurdy-gurdy in 1981 when his father, Christopher Eaton, began manufacturing them. Eaton has been described as the "foremost hurdy-gurdy player in popular music in North America and Europe".

Career 
Eaton has performed as a member of a number of different bands, including Whirling Pope Joan (with Julie Murphy), Blowzabella, Ancient Beatbox, The Duellists, and Firestarters of Leiden. He has released two solo albums, The Music of the Hurdy-Gurdy (1987) and Pandemonium (2002), and the collaborative album Panic at the Café (1993) with Andy Cutting.

As a session musician, Eaton has contributed to the film scores for Robin Hood, The Shipping News, Kingdom of Heaven, Aliens, Mansfield Park, Tulip Fever, and Carl Davis's 1980 score for the 1927 silent film Napoléon. Eaton wrote "The Halsway Schottische", a song which later became "The Halsway Carol" (with lyrics by friend and collaborator Iain Frisk) and has seen hundreds of versions performed. He has performed Howard Skempton's Concerto for Hurdy-gurdy and Percussion (written for himself and Evelyn Glennie) with the Scottish Chamber Orchestra and the Bournemouth Sinfonietta. 

Eaton has collaborated and recorded with a wide range of other artists including Afro Celt Sound System, Loreena McKennitt, Jimmy Page and Robert Plant, Scott Walker, Shelleyan Orphan, New London Consort, Heidi Berry, Gary Kemp, Bombay Bicycle Club, Blue Aeroplanes, Martin Simpson, The Palladian Ensemble, Moya Brennan, Robert Plant, Maddy Prior, June Tabor, Silly Sisters, The Tavener Consort, Jake Walton, and Hamish Moore.

In addition to his work in music and film, Eaton is a designer and maker of built-in furniture in South London.

Discography
Solo albums
The Music of the Hurdy-Gurdy (1987)
Pandemonium (2002)
Collaborative albums

 Panic at the Café (with Andy Cutting) (1993)

With Blowzabella
 Wall of Sound (1986)
 The B to A of Blowzabella (1986)
 A Richer Dust (1988)
 Vanilla (1990)
With Ancient Beatbox
Ancient Beatbox (1989)
With Whirling Pope Joan
Spin (1994)
With The Duellists
English Hurdy-Gurdy Music (1997)

Recording credits

References

External links
Nigel Eaton at Bandcamp

Living people
Hurdy-gurdy players
1966 births
English male musicians
Musicians from Hampshire